The 1988–89 Charlotte Hornets season was Charlotte's inaugural season in the National Basketball Association. The "Charlotte Hornets", along with the Miami Heat, began play as expansion teams during the 1988–89 season. The team revealed a new primary logo of a hornet bouncing a basketball, and got new pinstripe uniforms, adding teal to their color scheme. In the 1988 NBA expansion draft, the Hornets selected veteran players like Dell Curry, second-year guard Muggsy Bogues, Mike Holton, Dave Hoppen, Ricky Green, and Mike Brown, who was then traded to the Utah Jazz in exchange for Kelly Tripucka. The team also signed free agents; Kurt Rambis, who won four championships with the Los Angeles Lakers, Earl Cureton, and acquired Robert Reid from the Houston Rockets. The Hornets received the eighth overall pick in the 1988 NBA draft, and selected Rex Chapman from the University of Kentucky. Dick Harter was hired to be the team's first head coach.

The Hornets played their first game on November 4, 1988, losing 133–93 at the Charlotte Coliseum to the Cleveland Cavaliers. The team struggled losing 10 of their first 12 games, held a 13–35 record at the All-Star break, then posted two nine-game losing streaks between February and March, and between March and April. The Hornets finished the season last place in the Atlantic Division with a record of 20 wins and 62 losses, and led the NBA in home-game attendance, becoming the first expansion team to do so. Charlotte also set an all-time NBA attendance record, which was broken by Minnesota the following season. 

Tripucka led the team in scoring averaging 22.6 points per game, and finished tied in fourth place in Most Improved Player voting, while Chapman averaged 16.9 points per game, and was selected to the NBA All-Rookie Second Team, and Reid provided the team with 14.7 points per game. In addition, Rambis provided with 11.1 points, 9.4 rebounds and 1.3 steals per game, while Curry contributed 11.9 points per game off the bench, but only played just 48 games due to a wrist injury, Holton provided with 8.3 points and 6.3 assists per game, Cureton averaged 6.5 points and 6.0 rebounds per game, Hoppen provided with 6.5 points and 5.0 rebounds per game, and Bogues contributed 5.4 points, 7.8 assists and 1.4 steals per game.

The team's primary logo remained in use until 2002, while the uniforms lasted until 1997, where they added side panels and additional pinstripes to their jerseys.

Offseason

Expansion draft
The team's roster was filled as a result of an expansion draft in 1988. In a coin flip, the Hornets earned the right to choose either the higher choice in the college draft or the first pick in the expansion draft, picking the former. Most teams use such drafts to pick young players and guarantee a future, but Charlotte chose veterans in order to get a competitive lineup right away.

  Traded for Kelly Tripucka from the Utah Jazz
  Waived before the season.
  Traded for Robert Reid from the Houston Rockets.
 Sent to Portland Trail Blazers.

Also sent were Kurt Rambis of the Los Angeles Lakers and Earl Cureton of the Philadelphia 76ers.

NBA Draft
Subsequent to the expansion draft, Charlotte was given the eight pick in the 1988 NBA Draft. They selected Rex Chapman, a shooting guard out of University of Kentucky.

Roster

Preseason
The Hornets' first official NBA game took place on October 14, 1988, at the Madison Square Garden, and was a 118–97 preseason loss to the New Jersey Nets.

Regular season
The Hornets played their first season in the Eastern Conference's Atlantic Division. The team's first regular season NBA game took place on November 4, 1988, at the Charlotte Coliseum, and was a 133–93 loss to the Cleveland Cavaliers. Despite the huge loss, the Hornets received a standing ovation at the end of the game. November 8, 1988, the team won their first game over the Los Angeles Clippers, 117–105. On December 23, 1988, the Hornets defeated Michael Jordan and the Chicago Bulls 103–101 at the buzzer in Jordan's first return to North Carolina as a professional. During the season, Kelly Tripucka led the franchise with 22.6 points per game. Despite the Hornets mostly poor play (typical for an expansion franchise), the Hornets led the NBA in attendance during the season, selling out 36 of 41 home games (including the final 30).

Season standings

z – clinched division title
y – clinched division title
x – clinched playoff spot

Record vs. opponents

Game log

|- align="center" bgcolor="edbebf"
| 1 || November 4, 1988 || Cleveland || L 93–133 || Charlotte Coliseum || 23,338 || 0–1
|- align="center" bgcolor="edbebf"
| 2 || November 5, 1988 || @ Detroit || L 85–94 || The Palace of Auburn Hills || 21,454 || 0–2
|- align="center" bgcolor="#bbffbb"
| 3 || November 8, 1988 || L.A. Clippers || W 117–105 || Charlotte Coliseum || 18,865 || 1–2
|- align="center" bgcolor="edbebf"
| 4 || November 11, 1988 || @ Washington || L 87–96 || Capital Centre || 12,731 || 1–3
|- align="center" bgcolor="edbebf"
| 5 || November 12, 1988 || @ Atlanta || L 111–132 || The Omni || 16,155 || 1–4
|- align="center" bgcolor="edbebf"
| 6 || November 15, 1988 || New Jersey || L 99–106 || Charlotte Coliseum || 21,748 || 1–5
|- align="center" bgcolor="edbebf"
| 7 || November 17, 1988 || @ Dallas || L 93–105 || Reunion Arena || 16,512 || 1–6
|- align="center" bgcolor="#bbffbb"
| 8 || November 19, 1988 || @ San Antonio || W 107–105 || HemisFair Arena || 10,863 || 2–6
|- align="center" bgcolor="edbebf"
| 9 || November 22, 1988 || Detroit || L 93–99 || Charlotte Coliseum || 23,388 || 2–7
|- align="center" bgcolor="edbebf"
| 10 || November 23, 1988 || @ Boston || L 109–114 || Boston Garden || 14,890 || 2–8
|- align="center" bgcolor="edbebf"
| 11 || November 25, 1988 || @ Philadelphia || L 116–123 || Spectrum || 10,588 || 2–9
|- align="center" bgcolor="edbebf"
| 12 || November 26, 1988 || Washington || L 113–120 || Charlotte Coliseum || 23,388 || 2–10
|- align="center" bgcolor="#bbffbb"
| 13 || November 29, 1988 || Miami || W 99–84 || Charlotte Coliseum || 23,388 || 3–10
|-

|- align="center" bgcolor="#bbffbb"
| 14 || December 1, 1988 || Philadelphia || W 109–107 || Charlotte Coliseum || 21,716 || 4–10
|- align="center" bgcolor="edbebf"
| 15 || December 3, 1988 || @ Houston || L 104–108 || The Summit || 16,611 || 4–11
|- align="center" bgcolor="#bbffbb"
| 16 || December 9, 1988 || New Jersey || W 96–95 || Charlotte Coliseum || 23,388 || 5–11
|- align="center" bgcolor="edbebf"
| 17 || December 10, 1988 || @ New Jersey || L 112–121 (OT) || Brendan Byrne Arena || || 5–12
|- align="center" bgcolor="edbebf"
| 18 || December 13, 1988 || @ Indiana || L 104–115 || Market Square Arena || || 5–13
|- align="center" bgcolor="#bbffbb"
| 19 || December 14, 1988 || Indiana || W 115–106 || Charlotte Coliseum || 22,601 || 6–13
|- align="center" bgcolor="edbebf"
| 20 || December 16, 1988 || Dallas || L 98–107 || Charlotte Coliseum || 23,388 || 6–14
|- align="center" bgcolor="edbebf"
| 21 || December 17, 1988 || @ Detroit || L 91–100 || The Palace of Auburn Hills || 21,454 || 6–15
|- align="center" bgcolor="edbebf"
| 22 || December 20, 1988 || @ Milwaukee || L 115–125 || Bradley Center || 15,075 || 6–16
|- align="center" bgcolor="edbebf"
| 23 || December 21, 1988 || Milwaukee || L 100–112 || Charlotte Coliseum || 23,010 || 6–17
|- align="center" bgcolor="#bbffbb"
| 24 || December 23, 1988 || Chicago || W 103–101 || Charlotte Coliseum || 23,388 || 7–17
|- align="center" bgcolor="edbebf"
| 25 || December 26, 1988 || Houston || L 95–97 || Charlotte Coliseum || 23,388 || 7–18
|- align="center" bgcolor="edbebf"
| 26 || December 28, 1988 || @ Cleveland || L 98–122 || Richfield Coliseum || 17,353 || 7–19
|- align="center" bgcolor="#bbffbb"
| 27 || December 30, 1988 || New York || W 122–111 || Charlotte Coliseum || 23,388 || 8–19
|-

|- align="center" bgcolor="edbebf"
| 28 || January 3, 1989 || New Jersey || L 106–109 || Charlotte Coliseum || 23,388 || 8–20
|- align="center" bgcolor="edbebf"
| 29 || January 4, 1989 || @ Washington || L 86–109 || Capital Centre || || 8–21
|- align="center" bgcolor="edbebf"
| 30 || January 6, 1989 || @ Boston || L 92–115 || Boston Garden || 14,890 || 8–22
|- align="center" bgcolor="#bbffbb"
| 31 || January 7, 1989 || Washington || W 107–104 || Charlotte Coliseum || 23,388 || 9–22
|- align="center" bgcolor="edbebf"
| 32 || January 9, 1989 || Utah || L 92–114 || Charlotte Coliseum || 23,388 || 9–23
|- align="center" bgcolor="edbebf"
| 33 || January 11, 1989 || Chicago || L 101–106 || Charlotte Coliseum || 23,388 || 9–24
|- align="center" bgcolor="edbebf"
| 34 || January 12, 1989 || @ New York || L 89–106 || Madison Square Garden || 16,943 || 9–25
|- align="center" bgcolor="edbebf"
| 35 || January 15, 1989 || Philadelphia || L 109–116 || Charlotte Coliseum || 23,388 || 9–26
|- align="center" bgcolor="#bbffbb"
| 36 || January 16, 1989 || @ Philadelphia || W 127–122 (OT) || Spectrum || 10,116 || 10–26
|- align="center" bgcolor="edbebf"
| 37 || January 18, 1989 || @ Milwaukee || L 106–118 || Bradley Center || 16,145 || 10–27
|- align="center" bgcolor="edbebf"
| 38 || January 19, 1989 || Phoenix || L 112–126 || Charlotte Coliseum || 23,388 || 10–28
|- align="center" bgcolor="edbebf"
| 39 || January 21, 1989 || @ Atlanta || L 113–137 || The Omni || 16,371 || 10–29
|- align="center" bgcolor="edbebf"
| 40 || January 24, 1989 || @ Phoenix || L 103–106 || Arizona Veterans Memorial Coliseum || 11,089 || 10–30
|- align="center" bgcolor="#bbffbb"
| 41 || January 26, 1989 || @ Utah || W 89–88 || Salt Palace || 12,444 || 11–30
|- align="center" bgcolor="edbebf"
| 42 || January 27, 1989 || @ L.A. Lakers || L 97–114 || Great Western Forum || 17,505 || 11–31
|- align="center" bgcolor="edbebf"
| 43 || January 30, 1989 || @ Portland || L 118–130 || Memorial Coliseum || 12,848 || 11–32
|-

|- align="center" bgcolor="edbebf"
| 44 || February 1, 1989 || Boston || L 94–107 || Charlotte Coliseum || 23,388 || 11–33
|- align="center" bgcolor="#bbffbb"
| 45 || February 3, 1989 || Seattle || W 108–106 || Charlotte Coliseum || 23,388 || 12–33
|- align="center" bgcolor="edbebf"
| 46 || February 5, 1989 || Cleveland || L 91–110 || Charlotte Coliseum || 23,388 || 12–34
|- align="center" bgcolor="edbebf"
| 47 || February 7, 1989 || @ Chicago || L 93–118 || Chicago Stadium || 17,385 || 12–35
|- align="center" bgcolor="#bbffbb"
| 48 || February 9, 1989 || Atlanta || W 110–108 || Charlotte Coliseum || 23,388 || 13–35
|- align="center" bgcolor="edbebf"
| 49 || February 14, 1989 || New York || L 117–129 || Charlotte Coliseum || 23,388 || 13–36
|- align="center" bgcolor="edbebf"
| 50 || February 17, 1989 || @ Miami || L 102–103 || Miami Arena || 15,008 || 13–37
|- align="center" bgcolor="#bbffbb"
| 51 || February 18, 1989 || Indiana || W 119–114 || Charlotte Coliseum || 23,388 || 14–37
|- align="center" bgcolor="edbebf"
| 52 || February 22, 1989 || Chicago || L 102–130 || Charlotte Coliseum || 23,388 || 14–38
|- align="center" bgcolor="edbebf"
| 53 || February 23, 1989 || @ New York || L 114–139 || Madison Square Garden || 16,130 || 14–39
|- align="center" bgcolor="#bbffbb"
| 54 || February 25, 1989 || San Antonio || W 124–113 || Charlotte Coliseum || 23,388 || 15–39
|- align="center" bgcolor="edbebf"
| 55 || February 28, 1989 || Boston || L 87–112 || Charlotte Coliseum || 23,388 || 15–40
|-

|- align="center" bgcolor="edbebf"
| 56 || March 2, 1989 || @ New Jersey || L 103–114 || Brendan Byrne Arena || || 15–41
|- align="center" bgcolor="edbebf"
| 57 || March 3, 1989 || @ Atlanta || L 109–133 || The Omni || 16,371 || 15–42
|- align="center" bgcolor="edbebf"
| 58 || March 5, 1989 || @ Washington || L 101–114 || Capital Centre || 6,661 || 15–43
|- align="center" bgcolor="edbebf"
| 59 || March 8, 1989 || Denver || L 99–112 || Charlotte Coliseum || 23,388 || 15–44
|- align="center" bgcolor="edbebf"
| 60 || March 10, 1989 || L.A. Lakers || L 90–123 || Charlotte Coliseum || 23,388 || 15–45
|- align="center" bgcolor="edbebf"
| 61 || March 12, 1989 || Sacramento || L 105–114 || Charlotte Coliseum || 23,388 || 15–46
|- align="center" bgcolor="edbebf"
| 62 || March 14, 1989 || @ Denver || L 102–125 || McNichols Sports Arena || 10,522 || 15–47
|- align="center" bgcolor="edbebf"
| 63 || March 16, 1989 || @ Seattle || L 88–108 || Seattle Center Coliseum || || 15–48
|- align="center" bgcolor="#bbffbb"
| 64 || March 17, 1989 || @ L.A. Clippers || W 108–105 || Los Angeles Memorial Sports Arena || 10,758 || 16–48
|- align="center" bgcolor="edbebf"
| 65 || March 19, 1989 || @ Golden State || L 117–124 || Oakland–Alameda County Coliseum Arena || 15,025 || 16–49
|- align="center" bgcolor="#bbffbb"
| 66 || March 20, 1989 || @ Sacramento || W 117–110 || ARCO Arena || 16,517 || 17–49
|- align="center" bgcolor="edbebf"
| 67 || March 23, 1989 || Washington || L 97–102 || Charlotte Coliseum || 23,388 || 17–50
|- align="center" bgcolor="edbebf"
| 68 || March 25, 1989 || Detroit || L 101–113 || Charlotte Coliseum || 23,388 || 17–51
|- align="center" bgcolor="edbebf"
| 69 || March 27, 1989 || New York || L 105–121 || Charlotte Coliseum || 23,388 || 17–52
|- align="center" bgcolor="edbebf"
| 70 || March 30, 1989 || Golden State || L 104–113 || Charlotte Coliseum || 23,388 || 17–53
|-

|- align="center" bgcolor="edbebf"
| 71 || April 1, 1989 || Portland || L 121–125 (OT) || Charlotte Coliseum || 23,388 || 17–54
|- align="center" bgcolor="edbebf"
| 72 || April 4, 1989 || @ Chicago || L 101–121 || Chicago Stadium || 17,578 || 17–55
|- align="center" bgcolor="edbebf"
| 73 || April 7, 1989 || Philadelphia || L 108–118 || Charlotte Coliseum || 23,388 || 17–56
|- align="center" bgcolor="edbebf"
| 74 || April 9, 1989 || @ Cleveland || L 116–122 || Richfield Coliseum || 19,276 || 17–57
|- align="center" bgcolor="edbebf"
| 75 || April 10, 1989 || Atlanta || L 105–112 || Charlotte Coliseum || 23,388 || 17–58
|- align="center" bgcolor="#bbffbb"
| 76 || April 12, 1989 || @ New York || W 104–99 || Madison Square Garden || 18,385 || 18–58
|- align="center" bgcolor="#bbffbb"
| 77 || April 14, 1989 || @ Philadelphia || W 119–115 || Spectrum || 14,321 || 19–58
|- align="center" bgcolor="edbebf"
| 78 || April 15, 1989 || @ Indiana || L 105–115 || Market Square Arena || 11,860 || 19–59
|- align="center" bgcolor="edbebf"
| 79 || April 17, 1989 || Boston || L 108–113 (OT) || Charlotte Coliseum || 23,388 || 19–60
|- align="center" bgcolor="#bbffbb"
| 80 || April 18, 1989 || @ New Jersey || W 121–105 || Brendan Byrne Arena || || 20–60
|- align="center" bgcolor="edbebf"
| 81 || April 21, 1989 || Milwaukee || L 110–117 || Charlotte Coliseum || 23,388 || 20–61
|- align="center" bgcolor="edbebf"
| 82 || April 23, 1989 || @ Boston || L 110–120 || Boston Garden || 14,890 || 20–62
|-

|-
| 1988-89 Schedule

Player statistics

Awards and records
 Rex Chapman, NBA All-Rookie Team 2nd Team

Transactions
 July 1, 1988

Released Clinton Wheeler.
 July 18, 1988

Signed Earl Cureton as a free agent.

Traded Bernard Thompson to the Houston Rockets for Robert Reid and a 1990 2nd round draft pick (Steve Scheffler was later selected).
 July 28, 1988

Signed Kurt Rambis as an unrestricted free agent.
 August 17, 1988

Signed Tim Kempton as a free agent.
 October 6, 1988

Signed Brian Rowsom as a free agent.
 October 17, 1988

Released Sedric Toney.
 December 30, 1988

Waived Tom Tolbert.
 February 22, 1989

Waived Rickey Green.
 March 27, 1989

Signed Sidney Lowe to the first of two 10-day contracts.
 March 29, 1989

Signed Greg Kite to a contract for the rest of the season.

Waived Ralph Lewis.

Player Transactions Citation:

References

External links
 Expansion Draft Details

Charlotte Hornets seasons
Char
1988 in sports in North Carolina
1989 in sports in North Carolina